Falman-County Acres is a census-designated place (CDP) in San Patricio County, Texas, United States. The population was 289 at the 2000 census.

The Falman-County Acres CDP was deleted in the 2010 census and parts taken to form Country Acres and Falman CDPs.

Geography
Falman-County Acres is located at  (27.925416, -97.167400).

Demographics
As of the census of 2000, there were 289 people, 95 households, and 76 families residing in the CDP. The population density was 1,170.7 people per square mile (446.3/km2). There were 100 housing units at an average density of 405.1/sq mi (154.4/km2). The racial makeup of the CDP was 92.73% White, 1.38% African American, 4.84% from other races, and 1.04% from two or more races. Hispanic or Latino of any race were 18.69% of the population.

There were 95 households, out of which 37.9% had children under the age of 18 living with them, 54.7% were married couples living together, 17.9% had a female householder with no husband present, and 20.0% were non-families. 16.8% of all households were made up of individuals, and 5.3% had someone living alone who was 65 years of age or older. The average household size was 3.04 and the average family size was 3.29.

In the CDP, the population was spread out, with 31.8% under the age of 18, 8.3% from 18 to 24, 31.8% from 25 to 44, 15.9% from 45 to 64, and 12.1% who were 65 years of age or older. The median age was 33 years. For every 100 females, there were 107.9 males. For every 100 females age 18 and over, there were 89.4 males.

The median income for a household in the CDP was $26,354, and the median income for a family was $27,188. Males had a median income of $42,917 versus $13,750 for females. The per capita income for the CDP was $12,418. About 11.7% of families and 15.2% of the population were below the poverty line, including 33.3% of those under the age of eighteen and none of those 65 or over.

Education

Falman-County Acres is served by the Gregory-Portland Independent School District.

References

Census-designated places in San Patricio County, Texas
Census-designated places in Texas
Corpus Christi metropolitan area